Jubilant Sykes (born 1960, Los Angeles, California) is an American baritone.

Biography
Sykes was raised in Los Angeles, where he sang soprano as a boy. He is African American. He has performed with Christopher Parkening and other artists, and has appeared in such venues as the Metropolitan Opera, Deutsche Oper Berlin, Carnegie Hall, the Kennedy Center, London's Barbican Centre, the Apollo Theater, Hollywood Bowl, New Orleans Jazz Festival and hundreds of other major venues around the world.

Sykes performed the role of the Celebrant in the Grammy Award-nominated 2009 recording of Leonard Bernstein's Mass, with the Morgan State University Choir and Baltimore Symphony Orchestra under Marin Alsop, for Naxos Records.

Discography
Jubilant (Sony Music, 1998)
Wait for Me (Sony, 2001)
Jubilation (Angel Records, 2007)
Jubilant Sykes Sings Copland and Other Spirituals (Ariola Records, 2010)

References

21st-century African-American male singers
20th-century African-American male singers
20th-century American male opera singers
African-American male opera singers
American operatic baritones
Living people
Singers from Los Angeles
1960 births
Classical musicians from California